The Safaris were an American pop group of the early 1960s from Los Angeles, California.

The Safaris formed in 1959, and the following year released their debut single, "Image of a Girl". The song was a hit in the United States, peaking at #6 on the Billboard Hot 100. The song was covered by Mark Wynter the same year, this version hitting #11 in the United Kingdom.

Singles
"Image of a Girl" (Eldo Records, 1960)
"Girl with the Story in Her Eyes" (Eldo, 1960)
"In the Still of the Night" (Eldo, 1961)
"Soldier of Fortune" (Eldo, 1961)
"Legion of the Lost" b/w "Garden of Love" (Image Records, 1961)
"Childish Ways" b/w "Garden of Love" (as The Suddens; Sudden Records, 1962)

References

External links

Musical groups from Los Angeles